Ceratitis is a genus of tephritid fruit flies with about 80 species. One of the best known species is Ceratitis capitata, the Mediterranean fruit fly.

The genus contains several subgenera:
 Acropteromma
 Ceratalaspis
 Hoplolophomyia
 Pardalaspis
 Pterandrus

Species

Subgenus Acropteromma

 Ceratitis munroana (Bezzi)

Subgenus Ceratalaspis

 Ceratitis aliena (Bezzi) 
 Ceratitis andranotobaka Hancock 
 Ceratitis antistictica Bezzi 
 Ceratitis argenteobrunnea Munro 
 Ceratitis brucei Munro 
 Ceratitis connexa (Bezzi) 
 Ceratitis contramedia (Munro) 
 Ceratitis cosyra (Walker) 
 Ceratitis discussa Munro 
 Ceratitis divaricata (Munro) 
 Ceratitis dumeti Munro 
 Ceratitis epixantha (Hering) 
 Ceratitis grahami Munro 
 Ceratitis guttiformis Munro 
 Ceratitis hancocki De Meyer 
 Ceratitis lentigera Munro 
 Ceratitis lineata (Hering) 
 Ceratitis lunata Munro 
 Ceratitis marriotti Munro 
 Ceratitis mlimaensis De Meyer 
 Ceratitis morstatti Bezzi 
 Ceratitis nana Munro 
 Ceratitis neostictica De Meyer 
 Ceratitis ovalis Munro 
 Ceratitis paradumeti De Meyer 
 Ceratitis quinaria (Bezzi) 
 Ceratitis scaevolae (Munro) 
 Ceratitis silvestrii Bezzi 
 Ceratitis simi Munro 
 Ceratitis stictica Bezzi 
 Ceratitis striatella (Munro) 
 Ceratitis sucini De Meyer 
 Ceratitis turneri (Munro)
 Ceratitis venusta (Munro)

Subgenus Ceratitis

 Ceratitis brachychaeta Freidberg 
 Ceratitis caetrata Munro 
 Ceratitis capitata (Wiedemann) 
 Ceratitis catoirii Guérin-Méneville 
 Ceratitis cornuta (Bezzi) 
 Ceratitis malgassa Munro 
 Ceratitis manjakatompo Hancock 
 Ceratitis pinax Munro

Subgenus Hoplolophomyia

 Ceratitis cristata (Bezzi)

Subgenus Pardalaspis

 Ceratitis bremii Guérin-Méneville 
 Ceratitis cuthbertsoni (Munro) 
 Ceratitis ditissima (Munro) 
 Ceratitis edwardsi (Munro) 
 Ceratitis hamata De Meyer 
 Ceratitis munroi De Meyer 
 Ceratitis punctata (Wiedemann) 
 Ceratitis semipunctata De Meyer 
 Ceratitis serrata De Meyer 
 Ceratitis zairensis De Meyer

Subgenus Pterandrus

 Ceratitis acicularis (Munro) 
 Ceratitis anonae Graham 
 Ceratitis bicincta Enderlein 
 Ceratitis chirinda (Hancock) 
 Ceratitis colae Silvestri 
 Ceratitis curvata (Munro) 
 Ceratitis faceta Enderlein 
 Ceratitis flexuosa (Walker) 
 Ceratitis fulicoides (Munro) 
 Ceratitis gravinotata (Munro) 
 Ceratitis inauratipes (Munro) 
 Ceratitis lepida (Munro) 
 Ceratitis lobata Munro 
 Ceratitis melanopus (Hering) 
 Ceratitis pedestris (Bezzi) 
 Ceratitis penicillata (Bigot) 
 Ceratitis pinnatifemur Enderlein 
 Ceratitis podocarpi (Bezzi) 
 Ceratitis querita (Munro) 
 Ceratitis rosa Karsch 
 Ceratitis roubaudi (Bezzi) 
 Ceratitis rubivora (Coquillett) 
 Ceratitis tananarivana Hancock 
 Ceratitis tripteris (Munro)

Subgenus unknown

 Ceratitis fasciventris (Bezzi)

References

External links

On the UF / IFAS Featured Creatures Web site
  Ceratitis capitata, Mediterranean fruit fly 
  Ceratitis cosyra, mango  fruit fly 
  Ceratitis rosa, Natal fruit fly
  Tephritid Workers Database

Dacinae
Tephritidae genera
Taxa named by William Sharp Macleay